Martin Konczkowski (born 14 September 1993) is a Polish professional footballer who plays as a right-back for Ekstraklasa side Śląsk Wrocław.

Career statistics

Club

Honours

Club

Piast Gliwice
Ekstraklasa: 2018–19

References

External links

Living people
1993 births
Polish footballers
Poland youth international footballers
Association football defenders
Ruch Chorzów players
Piast Gliwice players
Śląsk Wrocław players
Ekstraklasa players
Sportspeople from Ruda Śląska